Weisenberger Mills is the oldest continuously operating grain mill in Kentucky.

Augustus Weisenberger purchased the property with mill in 1865. The current mill building was built in 1913 to replace the old 1818 stone one. The complex includes a 20 foot wheelhouse and a 1904 20,000 bushel ironclad grain elevator.

As of 2023, the water-powered mill has been operated as a family business since the 1860's by six generations of Weisenbergers. The mill produces flour, meal, feed and baking mixes which are shipped throughout the country. All of their grains are sourced locally, within 100 miles.

Power generation 

Prior to the construction of the 1913 building, the gristmill was powered by a water wheel. The 1913 building was constructed with a twin-turbine electric generator, powered by the river's water. With expansion of equipment over the years, the mill had to supplement their power needs by purchasing electricity from the local utility.

Working again with the consultant who had worked on the turbines in the 1980's, and the Center for Applied Energy Research at the University of Kentucky, Weisenberger Mills received a $56,000 grant from the US Department of Energy to install a variable speed generator like is commonly used in the wind turbine industry but which hadn't yet been tried in the hydroelectric industry.

In 2017, mill owner Mac Weisenberger said that energy they generate but don't use will go back into the electric grid. The success of the new system has resulted in four similar projects at larger hydroelectric plants on the Kentucky River.

References

External links 
 
 Video tour of the operating mill by Chef Donald Link (2021)
 Interview and video tour by Tim Farmer's Country Kitchen (2013)
 Drone footage by photographer Ben Childers (2020) showing the milldam, millpond, waterfall, the mill buildings, and the newly re-constructed vehicle bridge adjacent to the property

Grinding mills on the National Register of Historic Places
National Register of Historic Places in Scott County, Kentucky
National Register of Historic Places in Woodford County, Kentucky
Industrial buildings completed in 1913
1913 establishments in Kentucky
Grinding mills in Kentucky